Namu Atoll (Marshallese:) is a coral atoll of 54 islands in the Pacific Ocean, and forms a legislative district of the Ralik Chain of the Marshall Islands.

There are four main population centres, the islands of Namu, Majkin, Loen and Mae. The population of Namu Atoll was 780 in 2011.

History
The Spanish expedition of Álvaro de Mendaña made the first recorded sighting by Europeans of Namu Atoll on 17 September 1568. The pilot, Hernán Gallego, mistook it for San Bartolome (Bokak Atoll), which Toribio Alonso de Salazar had seen in 1526, although Bokak was a long way to the north. Mendaña says they named them San Mateo Shoals. The islands were inhabited, with many houses. A landing party found a chisel made of a nail and pieces of rope which were presumably gifts left there on 3 July 1566 by the galleon San Jerónimo, then commanded by the rebel pilot Lope Martín. Captain Thomas Dennet of the British vessel Britannia sighted the atoll in 1797 on route from Australia to China and named it Ross Island.

The Empire of Germany claimed Namu Atoll along with the rest of the Marshall Islands in 1884, and the Germans established a trading post. After World War I, the island came under the South Seas Mandate of the Empire of Japan. The base became part of the vast US Naval Base Marshall Islands. Following the end of World War II, it came under the control of the United States as part of the Trust Territory of the Pacific Islands until 1986 when the Marshall Islands achieved their independence.

Education
Marshall Islands Public School System operates public schools:
 Loen Elementary School
 Mae Elementary School
 Majkin Elementary School
 Namo Elementary School

Students are zoned to Jaluit High School in Jaluit Atoll.

In the 1994–1995 school year Namu had one private high school.

References

External links
 Marshall Islands site
 

Atolls of the Marshall Islands
Ralik Chain
Municipalities of the Marshall Islands